Rockin' Through the Decades is a live-action/animated TV special based on characters from Alvin and the Chipmunks. It was directed by Steve Karman, produced by Bagdasarian Productions, and premiered on NBC on January 18, 1991.

The special was released on VHS by Buena Vista Home Video in 1992 as Rockin' with the Chipmunks. Most recently, the special has been re-released on September 8, 2009, by Paramount Home Entertainment on the DVD The Very First Alvin Show alongside A Chipmunk Reunion. In 1992, it aired on The Disney Channel.

Cast 
 Will Smith - Himself (credited as Fresh Prince)
 Ross Bagdasarian, Jr. Alvin and Simon (voice)
 Janice Karman - Theodore and Brittany (voice)
 Ben Vereen - Himself
 Richard Moll - Himself
 Kenny Loggins - Himself
 Raven-Symoné - Herself
 Shelley Duvall - Herself
 Markie Post - Herself
 Little Richard - Himself
 Michael Jackson - Himself (archive footage)

Rockin' with the Chipmunks 
Rockin' with the Chipmunks made significant changes to the featured songs.

 "Witch Doctor"
 Intro medley, done by Alvin in different styles
 Little Richard (style of "Tutti Frutti")
 Elvis Presley (style of "Blue Suede Shoes")
 Jimi Hendrix (style of "Foxy Lady")
 Bob Dylan (style of "Like a Rolling Stone")
 Michael Jackson (style of "Billie Jean")
 Bruce Springsteen (style of "Born in the U.S.A.")
 "Tutti Frutti"/"Heartbreak Hotel" (medley, 1950s)
 "Surfin' Safari"/"She Loves You"/"(I Can't Get No) Satisfaction" (medley, 1960s)
 "Crocodile Rock" (1970s)
 "Smooth Criminal"/"Beat It" (medley, Alvin added to the original music videos, 1980s)
 "Sleigh Ride" (original Christmas-themed hip hop song, 1990s)

Segments from two episodes of The Alvin Show, A Chipmunk Christmas and an episode of The Ed Sullivan Show are also featured. "Alvin's Harmonica" can be heard in the background while Fresh Prince is on the 1950s set. Fresh Prince also does a rap introduction to the "Sleigh Ride" segment, giving his perspective on what to expect of the 1990s.

Soundtrack album release 

Rockin' Through the Decades is also the title of a soundtrack music album by Alvin and the Chipmunks, released by Chipmunk Records in 1991, and contained all of the songs from the TV special, alongside three added tracks.

 "Witch Doctor (Decades Mix)"
 "Tutti Frutti"
 "She Loves You ('90s Reprise)"
 "(I Can't Get No) Satisfaction"
 "Girls Just Want to Have Fun" - The Chipettes
 "Beat It ('90s Remix)"
 "Heartbreak Hotel"
 "Crocodile Rock"
 "Surfin' Safari"
 "Oh, Pretty Woman"
 "Johnny B. Goode"
 "Sleigh Ride"

References

External links 
 

1991 films
Alvin and the Chipmunks films
American films with live action and animation
1990s American television specials
1990s animated television specials
EMI Records soundtracks
1991 soundtrack albums
Alvin and the Chipmunks albums
1991 television specials
1991 in American television
Films with screenplays by Ross Bagdasarian Jr.
Films with screenplays by Janice Karman
1990s American films